Ian Thomas Warburton (born 22 March 1952) is an English former professional footballer who played as a striker.

Career
Born in Haslingden, Warburton played for Haslingden, Bury, Southport and Accrington Stanley.

Later life
Warburton later became a mechanical engineer, running his own design company.

References

1952 births
Living people
People from Haslingden
English footballers
Haslingden F.C. players
Bury F.C. players
Southport F.C. players
Accrington Stanley F.C. players
English Football League players
Association football forwards